Messy Slick is a collaboration album between American rappers Messy Marv and Mitchy Slick, released on March 27, 2007. It peaked at #95 on the R&B/Hip-Hop Albums chart. It includes guest appearances from Yukmouth, Keak da Sneak, Rah2K, Damu, T-Nutty, Tiny Doo, Styles P and Krondon.

Track listing

References

2007 albums
Messy Marv albums
Mitchy Slick albums
Collaborative albums
Albums produced by Tha Bizness